Miss Colombia 2022 was the 69th edition of the Miss Colombia pageant. It was held at the Julio Cesar Turbay Ayala Convention Center in Cartagena de Indias, Colombia on November 13, 2022.

At the end of the event, Valentina Espinosa of Bolivar crowned Sofía Osío Luna of Atlántico as Señorita Colombia 2022-2023, and will represent Colombia at Miss International 2023.

Results

Final results

Special awards

Pageant

Format 
The results of the preliminary competition, which consisted of the swimsuit competition, the evening gown competition, and the closed-door interview, will determine the 10 semifinalists who will advance to the first cut. Internet voting is still being implemented and fans can vote for their favorite delegate to advance to the finals. The top 10 will compete in the swimsuit and evening gown competitions and then narrow down to the top 5. The first 5 will compete. in the preliminary round of questions and answers. The last catwalk will be recovered, after which Miss Colombia 2022 and its four finalists will be announced.

Judges 
 Daniella Álvarez – Presenter, TV host and Miss Colombia 2011
 Eduardo Díaz – Panamanian economist
 Mario López Chavarri – Peruvian diplomat and politician
 Carlos Santa Cruz – Spanish businessman

Contestants 
29 contestants competed for the title.

Notes

Post-pageant notes 

 Valentina Mora of Antioquia was appointed as the representative of her country at Miss Supranational 2023, to be held on July 14, 2023 in Poland.
 Andrea Yáñez of Norte de Santander was appointed as the representative of her country at Miss Mesoamerica 2023, to be held on March 19, 2023 in San Salvador, El Salvador.
 María Camila Sinning of Cartagena was appointed as the representative of her country at Reinado Internacional del Cacao 2023, to be held on July 7, 2023 in Panama.

References

External links
 

2022 in Colombia
Miss Colombia
Colombia